Andranomisa is a rural village in the Analamanga Region, Madagascar, in the district of Anjozorobe.

It has a population of 7,692 inhabitants in 2019.

References

External links
 mindat.org

Populated places in Analamanga